Bulgebi is a nearly extinct Finisterre languages of Papua New Guinea. It is spoken in the Madang province near the Astrolabe Bay and the lower Nankina river, slightly inland on the eastern end of the southern coast.

References

Definitely endangered languages
Endangered Papuan languages
Finisterre languages
Languages of Madang Province